Kamran Akhter is a Pakistani politician who had been a Member of the Provincial Assembly of Sindh, from May 2013 to May 2018.

Early life and education
He was born on 10 April 1977 in Karachi.

He has a degree of Bachelors of Arts from Karachi University.

Political career

He was elected to the Provincial Assembly of Sindh as a candidate of Mutahida Quami Movement from Constituency PS-91 KARACHI-III in 2013 Pakistani general election.

References

Living people
Sindh MPAs 2013–2018
1977 births
Muttahida Qaumi Movement politicians